Transfer: European Review of Labour and Research is a quarterly peer-reviewed academic journal that covers the field of management studies. The journal's editor-in-chief is Maria Jepsen (European Trade Union Institute). It was established in 1995 and is currently published by SAGE Publications on behalf of the European Trade Union Institute.

Abstracting and indexing 
Transfer is abstracted and indexed in:
 Business Source Corporate
 Current Contents/ Social and Behavioral Sciences
 Human Resources Abstracts
 Scopus
 Social Sciences Citation Index

External links 
 

SAGE Publishing academic journals
English-language journals
Business and management journals
Publications established in 1995
Quarterly journals
Academic journals associated with international learned and professional societies of Europe